Formosa is an island in the Bissagos Islands, Guinea-Bissau, part of the sector of Caravela. Its area is 140 km², its length is 19.9 km and its width is 10 km. It forms practically one island with Ponta and Maio, separated by creeks. The island has a population of 1,873 (2009 census); the largest village is Abú.

References 

Bolama Region
Bissagos Islands